Kim Hyun-jin (born August 24, 1996) is a South Korean actor and model. He is known for his roles in dramas such as Can You Deliver Time?, Sugar Coating, Peach of Time, and Peng.

Life and career
Kim was born on August 24, 1996, and attended an all-boys high school. He joined YG KPlus and made his debut as a model in 2015, making appearances as a runway model in a number of modeling shows for Kimseoryon, D.Gnak, Caruso, Sling Stone and SongGzio Homme, Ordinary People. He also appeared in magazines Go Korea and Dazed Korea. He also appeared in commercials for Subway and Banila Co.

Kim worked with WM Company to pursue a career in acting, citing Park Seo-joon as his role model. Kim was cast in the web series Sugar Coating and Can You Deliver Time? in 2020. The following year, he appeared in drama Peach of Time and he also appeared in drama Peng starring with actress Yoon So-hee.

Personal life

Military service 
Kim has been mandatory military service since the age of 21.

Filmography

Film

Television series

Web series

Discography

Singles

Awards and nominations

References

External links
 
 
 

1996 births
Living people
21st-century South Korean male actors
South Korean male models
South Korean male television actors
South Korean male film actors
YG Entertainment artists